The Mid-American Conference football awards are given annually by the Mid-American Conference (MAC) at the conclusion of each college football season.  The conference gives out a total of five awards, the Offensive, Defensive, and Freshman Players of the Year, the Coach of the Year, and the Vern Smith Leadership Award, which is given to the league's MVP in that season.  The Vern Smith Award is selected by a vote of the coaches in the MAC while the remaining awards are selected by the MAC News Media Association.

Offensive Player of the Year

Winners
Source:

Winners by school

Defensive Player of the Year

Winners
Source:

Winners by school

Special Teams Player of the Year

Winners 
Source:

Winners by school

Freshman Player of the Year 

The Freshman Player of the Year award was first given by the MAC after the 1982 football season.  That year's winner, Brian McClure, won a slew of MAC accords, including Offensive Player of the Year three times, and the Vern Smith award twice.  Ball State, Central Michigan and Western Michigan are tied with the most awards, with players from each school winning five times.

Winners 
Source:

Winners by school

Vern Smith Leadership Award

The Vern Smith Leadership Award was started in 1982 by the Downtown Toledo Athletic Club.  In that year, it was known as the Jefferson Award and the name was changed to honor the University of Toledo Athletic Director Vern Smith in 1987.  The award is given to the top football player in the Mid-American Conference.  Only four players have won the award multiple times, with the most recent winner, Larry English, being the only non-quarterback to win it.  Northern Illinois leads with seven awards all-time, followed by Bowling Green, Central Michigan and Marshall tied with four awards in each school.  The Vern Smith award is the only one voted on by the coaches, with the Coach of the Year, as well as the Players of the Year are selected by the media.

Winners
Source:

Winners by school

Coach of the Year

The MAC has awarded a Coach of the Year award every year since 1965.  The first award went to Bo Schembechler of Miami University.  Only one coach has won the award more than twice, with Frank Lauterbur winning the award in 1967, 1969, and 1970.  Only two coaches have won the award beyond their tenth year of coaching.  Bill Hess won the award in 1968 in his 11th year of coaching the Ohio Bobcats and Herb Deromedi won the award in 1990, his 13th year of coaching Central Michigan.  Also, only one coach, Bill Mallory, has won the award coaching two separate teams.  He first earned the award in 1973 while coaching Miami University, and then won ten years later giving Northern Illinois their first Coach of the Year award.  Toledo leads all schools with nine awards. Temple won their first award in 2009 when head coach Al Golden won his first MAC Coach of the Year award.

Winners
Source:

Winners by school

References 

College football conference awards and honors
Awards